ISO 3166-2:SI is the entry for Slovenia in ISO 3166-2, part of the ISO 3166 standard published by the International Organization for Standardization (ISO), which defines codes for the names of the principal subdivisions (e.g., provinces or states) of all countries coded in ISO 3166-1.

Currently for Slovenia, ISO 3166-2 codes are defined for 200 municipalities and 12 urban municipalities. 

Each code consists of two parts, separated by a hyphen. The second part is three digits, which is the municipality code used by the Statistical Office of the Republic of Slovenia:
 001–147 (except 145): communes as from 1995 to 1998
 148–193: communes created in 1998
 194: municipality created in 2002
 195–206: communes created in March 2006
 207–211: communes created in June 2006
 212–213: communes created in 2011

The codes for all groups of communes are assigned in Slovenian alphabetical order, except Tišina and Šalovci (whose codes are assigned based on their former names, Cankova-Tišina and Hodoš Šalovci respectively) as well as Rogašovci (of which the former spelling was Rogačovci). Žalec, whose municipality code was 145, uses 190 after splitting into multiple municipalities in 1998. Ankaran was added in 2016.

Current codes
Subdivision names are listed as in the ISO 3166-2 standard published by the ISO 3166 Maintenance Agency (ISO 3166/MA).

Subdivision names are sorted in Slovenian alphabetical order: a-c, č, d-s, š, t-z, ž.

Click on the button in the header to sort each column.

Changes

The following changes to the entry are listed on ISO's online catalogue, the Online Browsing Platform:

The following changes to the entry have been announced in newsletters by the ISO 3166/MA since the first publication of ISO 3166-2 in 1998. ISO stopped issuing newsletters in 2013.

Codes before Newsletter I-4

See also
 Subdivisions of Slovenia
 FIPS region codes of Slovenia
 NUTS codes of Slovenia

External links
 ISO Online Browsing Platform: SI
 Regions of Slovenia, Statoids.com
 Communes of Slovenia, Statoids.com

2:SI
 ISO 3166-2
Slovenia geography-related lists